Lord Morpheous is a Canadian sex educator, author and photographer based in New York. He is the author of How to Be Kinky: A Beginner’s Guide to BDSM, How to Be Kinkier: More Adventures in Adult Playtime and Bondage Basics: Naughty Knots and Risque Restraints You Need to Know. Morpheous' work is archived in the Sexual Representation Collection of the University of Toronto's Mark S. Bonham Centre for Sexual Diversity Studies, at the Leather Archives and Museum in Chicago, and at the National Archives of Canada. Morpheous has taught a variety of workshops on rope bondage, the aesthetics of bondage, fetish photography, advanced and beginner BDSM, and workshops catered to professional dominants and submissives. He is also the founder of Morpheous’ Bondage Extravaganza, an annual rope bondage themed art installation.

Education
Morpheous gained a B.Ed and an Honours BA in Visual Art with a Minor in English. He also has a Degree in Broadcasting.

Morpheous' Bondage Extravaganza
Lord Morpheous hosts an annual event called Morpheous' Bondage Extravaganza (also known as MBE), an annual public display of rope bondage during the Nuit Blanche festival in Toronto. The event features 12 hours of rope bondage art ranging from simple bondage performed on the floor to aerial suspension. This installation is not an official part of Nuit Blanche. According to the event website, the first Morpheous’ Bondage Extravaganza took place in a storefront window on Toronto's Queen Street West in 2007, and has since grown to a 4,000 square foot venue in Toronto. The event is also live-streamed over the internet and has also recently expanded to include an MBE in Orlando, Florida and San Francisco, California. The event has grown over the years, and has attracted 6000 attendees cross the three cities with another 75,000 watching online.

KinkMe App
Morpheous is the creator of the KinkMe app. This app is designed to help the user determine their "kink compatibility" with other KinkMe app users. It instructs the user to fill out a checklist of kinky activities and then bump phones with another user to compare their kink interests and gauge their compatibility.

Altsexed
Altsexed is a website dedicated to lectures and classes by Morpheous. According to the website altsexed.com, lectures and classes by Morpheous are suitable for: 
 human sexuality courses and psychology & social studies
 safer sex presentations, LGBT organizations
 sexual diversity studies programs
 Undergraduate orientation week

Journalism
Morpheous currently writes a BDSM and rope bondage column aimed at kink beginners for Hustler Hollywood, in which he discusses such topics as consent and communication, safety in kinky sex, and how to bring up BDSM with your partner.

Bibliography
 How to be Kinky: A Beginner's Guide to BDSM; 2008, Green Candy Press, 
 How To Be Kinkier: More Adventures in Adult Playtime; 2012, Green Candy Press, 
 Bondage Basics: Naughty Knots and Risque Restraints You Need to Know; 2015, Quiver Books,

References

External links 
 

BDSM writers
Living people
Year of birth missing (living people)
Canadian non-fiction writers
Sex educators